Human Factors in Engineering and Design is an engineering textbook, currently in its seventh edition. The book, first published in 1957, is considered a classic in human factors and ergonomics, and one of the best-established texts in the field. It is frequently taught in upper-level and graduate courses in the U.S., and is relied on by practicing human factors and ergonomics professionals.

The text is divided into six sections: Introduction; Information Input; Human Output and Control; Work Space and Arrangement; Environment; and Human Factors: Selected Topics.

See also
Anthropometry
Industrial and organizational psychology

References

Engineering textbooks
McGraw-Hill books
Ergonomics
Occupational safety and health
Industrial engineering
Systems psychology